Zachary George Onyego Vyner (born 14 May 1997) is an English professional footballer who plays as a defender for Bristol City.

Career
On 20 February 2016, Vyner made his Championship debut for Bristol City in a 2–0 victory against Milton Keynes Dons.

On 10 February 2018, Vyner scored his first senior goal for Plymouth Argyle in a 2–1 away victory against Shrewsbury Town

On 2 July 2018, Vyner agreed a season-long loan with fellow Championship club Rotherham United.

Vyner moved to Scottish Premiership club Aberdeen on loan in August 2019.

He scored his first goal for Bristol City in a 2–0 win over Preston North End on 16 January 2021.

Career statistics

References

External links

1997 births
Living people
People educated at Beechen Cliff School
English footballers
Association football defenders
Bristol City F.C. players
Accrington Stanley F.C. players
Rotherham United F.C. players
English Football League players
Plymouth Argyle F.C. players
Aberdeen F.C. players
Scottish Professional Football League players